Purni Suder Shah, also known as The Dwelling Place Of Sufi Saint Suder Shah, is a village in the Budgam district in the Indian union territory of Jammu and Kashmir. It lies in the Narbal tehsil of district Budgam, on the eastern side of Mazhom railway station. It is a small village and only a few generations have lived here. It is recognised for its vegetation and agriculture.

History
The first person who came and settled here was late Abdul Ahad Mir S/O late Abdul Habib Mir [around 1800 AD] whose ancestors belong to Kanihama. Now the village has 45-50 households. The only link road which joins the village to other part of the district is through Archanderhama.

Before the new generations, the village is said to have been inhabited by people during ancient times, as different kinds of remains have been excavated while digging in farms, such as vessels made of terracotta. It is said that the people might have left the place because the area is prone to floods or they might have been annihilated by some devastating havoc.

The village is named after a Sufi Saint Suder Shah who is buried here in a local graveyard.  Purn is a Kashmiri word which means dwelling place and thus Purni Suder Shah means dwelling place of Sufi saint Suder Shah.

Geography
Purni Suder Shah is a small village located in the sub-district of Beerwah, Jammu and Kashmir, India. It is 2.5 kilometers away from kanihama gulmarg road and half a kilometer away from Mazhom railway station. Unfortunately neither it is connected to the railway station directly nor to its district but a link road through archanderhama which is in district baramulla joins the village with the rest of the district. Purni Suder Shah is located at 34.11°N 74.620°E. It has an average elevation of 1569 meters (5147 feet). Some of the famous places in the neighborhood of Purni Suder Shah are Mazhom railway station, Kanihama(famous for Kani-Shawl), Magam (busy market place), Archanderhama, Habak etc.

Education
Purni Suder Shah has only one primary school and its building is owned by Masjid committee.

Transport
Purni Suder Shah is not yet connected with the State and District Highway roads neither it is connected to railway station. The postal code of the village is 193401.Postal Code: PURNI SUDER SHAH, Post Kanihama BO (Baramulla, Jammu and Kashmir)

References

External links
 Ampa Nagar pincode - 638008

Villages in Budgam district